James Clerk Maxwell Garnett CBE (1880–1958), commonly known as Maxwell Garnett, was an English educationist, barrister, peace campaigner and physicist. He was Secretary of the League of Nations Union.

Maxwell Garnett was born on 13 October 1880 at Cherry Hinton, Cambridge, England. He was awarded scholarships at St Paul's School, London and Trinity College, Cambridge. He was called to the bar at Inner Temple in 1908. He was an examiner at the UK Board of Trade (1904–12), Principal at the Manchester College of Technology (1912–20), and Secretary of the League of Nations Union (1920–38). Garnett was appointed a CBE in 1919.

In Trinity College, Maxwell Garnett worked in optics, publishing papers on optical properties of metals and metal glasses in early 1900s. The Maxwell Garnett approximation is named after him.

Personal life
Maxwell Garnett was the son of physicist William Garnett, and was named after Garnett's friend, James Clerk Maxwell.

In 1910, Maxwell Garnett married Margaret Lucy Poulton, daughter of the evolutionary biologist Sir Edward Poulton FRS, in Headington, Oxford. They had six children. 
The Garnetts lived at 37 Park Town, North Oxford, from 1939 until 1955, when they moved to the Isle of Wight.

Selected publications
Journal papers

References

External links
 
 Books by James Clerk Maxwell Garnett on Amazon.com
 (James Clerk) Maxwell Garnett (1880–1958), Barrister-at-Law portraits in the National Portrait Gallery, London

1880 births
1958 deaths
People from Cherry Hinton
People educated at St Paul's School, London
Alumni of Trinity College, Cambridge
People associated with the University of Manchester Institute of Science and Technology
League of Nations
English educational theorists
English barristers
English anti-war activists
English non-fiction writers
Commanders of the Order of the British Empire
English male non-fiction writers
Optical physicists
English physicists
20th-century British physicists
20th-century English lawyers
20th-century English male writers